The Protection from Eviction Act 1977 (c 43) is an Act of Parliament of the United Kingdom protecting people renting accommodation from losing their homes without the involvement of a court.

Contents
The Act's aim is to protect tenants from being ejected from their homes by landlords, unless there has been a court order.

Section 3 states that nobody can be forcibly evicted without a court order. The purpose of this section was to prevent aggressive landlords becoming violent.

Section 3A states that there are a number of exclusions. These are primarily when a landlord actually resides in the same property as the tenant, or the accommodation falls within the definition of a hostel or hotel.

Section 5 states that everyone, whether classified as having a lease or a licence, is required to be given four weeks notice before they are evicted. Any "notice to quit" has no effect before this time.

Failure to respect the Act
Police have frequently failed to intervene when tenants were forceably removed from their homes without a court order or when tenants' property was removed from their homes and locks changed without a court order.  Shelter maintain that in 2016 nearly 50,000 tenants had their belongings removed, and the locks changed by landlords. Over 200,000 tenants were harassed by their landlord and some 600,000 had their  landlord enter their home without permission.  Police wrongly believe these are civil matters and police need better training in the law.  Eviction without a court order is a criminal offence under the Protection from Eviction Act 1977.

See also

English land law
English property law
Landlord and Tenant Act 1985

References

External links
Protection from Eviction Act 1977 Full legislation on legislation.gov.uk

United Kingdom Acts of Parliament 1977
English property law